Encounters in the Deep (also known as Uragano sulle Bermude - L'ultimo S.O.S. - ), is a 1979 Italian / Spanish / Mexican film directed by Tonino Ricci (as Anthony Richmond) and starring Andrés García, Gianni Garko and Gabriele Ferzetti.

Plot
United States, late 1970s. An engaged couple mysteriously disappears in the Bermuda Triangle. Her father wants to see clearly, and organizes an expedition to that area along with Mike. When they get there, they discover the presence of extraterrestrial communities, who are carrying out studies on the human race.

Cast
 Andrés García as Scott
 Gianni Garko as Mike 
 Gabriele Ferzetti as Miles 
 Manuel Zarzo as Peters 
 Alfredo Mayo as Pop 
 Carole André as Mary

References

External links

Encounters in the Deep on the Internet Archive

1979 films
1970s Italian-language films
Films directed by Tonino Ricci
Italian science fiction films
1970s science fiction films
Films set in the Bermuda Triangle
Films scored by Stelvio Cipriani
1970s Italian films